The Actors' Lab is an independent drama school with studios at MediaCityUK, Salford, Greater Manchester, founded  in 2011 by husband and wife actors Sue Jenkins, David Fleeshman and daughter Emily Fleeshman.

Classes and workshops provide services for aspiring and professional actors offering training, support and selective representation.
In 2016 the Acting in London blog listed it among the top 10 best acting schools for children in the United Kingdom.

In 2016, company director Emily Fleeshman was nominated for the E3 North West business young entrepreneur of the year award.

References

External links

Drama schools in the United Kingdom
Educational institutions established in 2011
Education in Salford
2011 establishments in England